Foul Play Suspected is a  1935 crime novel by British writer John Wyndham.  It was published by Newnes under the pen name of John Beynon.

The novel's protagonist, Detective-Inspector Jordon, also appears in two other 1930s novels by Wyndham, which remain unpublished: Murder Means Murder and  Death Upon Death.

References

British detective novels
Novels by John Wyndham
1935 British novels
Works published under a pseudonym
George Newnes Ltd books